The Wolf River is a river in Thunder Bay District in Northwestern Ontario, Canada. It is in the Great Lakes Basin and is a tributary Lake Superior.

Course
The river begins at Upper Wolf Lake in geographic Glen Township and heads east to Upper Clearwater Lake. It turns southeast through Lower Clearwater Lake, then east, northeast and once again southeast to Wolf Lake. It passes southeast out of the lake over a weir dam and enters the municipality of Dorion, heads under Ontario Highway 17/Ontario Highway 11 (at this point part of the Trans-Canada Highway) and the Canadian Pacific Railway transcontinental main line, and reaches Black Bay on Lake Superior.

Tributaries
Cavern Creek (right)
Wolfpup Creek (left)
Unknown Creek (left)
Moraine Creek (left)
Furcate Creek (right)
Springlet Creek (left)
Greenwich Creek (right)
Hickey Creek (right)

See also  
List of rivers of Ontario

References

Sources

Rivers of Thunder Bay District
Tributaries of Lake Superior